Udonis Johneal Haslem ( born June 9, 1980) is an American professional basketball player for the Miami Heat of the National Basketball Association (NBA). He played college basketball for the Florida Gators, where he was a key member of four NCAA tournament teams. Haslem began his professional career in France with Chalon-sur-Saône and then signed with his hometown Miami Heat in 2003 and has become the longest tenured Heat player in franchise history. He has also won three NBA championships while playing for the Heat.

Early life
Haslem was born in Miami. His father, John, played college basketball for the Stetson Hatters from 1972 to 1974. His mother, Debra, was Puerto Rican. Haslem attended Wolfson High School in Jacksonville, Florida, then Miami Senior High School in Miami. He helped lead Miami High to state titles in 1997 and 1998 (the last two of three in a row), playing alongside another future NBA player, Steve Blake. The team was coached by former South Carolina head coach Frank Martin.

However, an investigation by the Miami New Times revealed that Haslem, Blake and several other players circumvented residency requirements. The New Times reported that while he claimed to live in Miami, he actually lived in Miramar. His official school address was an efficiency apartment owned by a longtime Miami High booster, which was also a violation of Florida High School Athletic Association (FHSAA) rules. As a result, Miami High was stripped of its 1998 title and ordered to forfeit its entire schedule.

College career
Haslem accepted an athletic scholarship to attend the University of Florida in Gainesville, Florida, where he played for coach Billy Donovan's Gators teams from 1998 to 2002, while majoring in leisure service management. As the Gators' starting center for four years, he was part of Donovan's 1998 recruiting class that raised the national prominence of the Florida Gators basketball program, and included future Miami Heat teammate Mike Miller. His sophomore season saw the team advance to the NCAA Men's Division I Basketball Championship game, before falling to the Michigan State Spartans 89–76. The Gators received NCAA tournament invitations four consecutive years during his college career–the first time in the program's history. During his tenure with Florida, Haslem averaged 13.7 points per game and 6.7 rebounds per game. He was named to the coaches' All-Southeastern Conference (SEC) team four times: as the third team in 1999 and 2000, and the first team in 2001 and 2002. Haslem also ranks third in team history in points scored (1,782) and tenth in rebounds (831). He was inducted into the University of Florida Athletic Hall of Fame as a "Gator Great" in 2012.

Professional career

Chalon-Sur-Saône (2002–2003)
Haslem went undrafted in the 2002 NBA draft largely due to his relative lack of size for a forward; he measured just  at the NBA pre-draft camp. He accepted an offer to join the Atlanta Hawks for training camp and made their roster for the Shaw's Pro Summer League. Haslem was released by the Hawks before the start of the 2002–03 NBA season.

While in France, he lost  in eight months. Haslem averaged 16.1 points and 9.4 rebounds per game in his one season with the team.

Miami Heat (2003–present)

2003–2008: All-Rookie honors and first championship

On August 6, 2003, Haslem signed with his hometown team, the Miami Heat. As a rookie, he played in the Rookie Challenge during All-Star weekend, earned NBA All-Rookie Second Team honors, and helped the Heat reach the Eastern Conference Semifinals.

In 2004–05, Haslem started in all 80 games in which he appeared, averaging 10.9 points, a career-high 9.1 rebounds and 1.4 assists in 33.4 minutes per game. His .540 field goal percentage ranked fifth on the Heat's all-time single-season list at the time. His .540 field goal percentage also ranked fourth in the NBA. Haslem appeared in the Rookie Challenge for the second straight year, this time for the sophomore team.

Haslem re-signed with the Heat in August 2005. In June 2006, he helped the Heat win their maiden NBA Championship with a 4–2 victory over the Dallas Mavericks in the NBA Finals. Haslem recorded 17 points and 10 rebounds in the title-clinching game six.

Haslem scored a career-high 28 points on November 10, 2006, in a 113–106 win over the New Jersey Nets.

On January 29, 2008, Haslem—who had been the only Miami player to start all 43 games of the 2007–08 season—sustained a sprained left ankle during the Heat's 117–87 loss to the Boston Celtics. He returned to action on February 23, only to play in five games before being ruled out for the rest of the season after reaggravating the ankle injury on March 7 against the Golden State Warriors. He averaged a career-high 12.0 points per game in 2007–08.

2009–2013: Back-to-back championships
In July 2010, Haslem signed a five-year deal worth approximately $20 million to remain with the Heat. The contract paid him roughly $14 million less than he could have received if he accepted more lucrative offers from the Dallas Mavericks or Denver Nuggets. He continued on with a new-look Heat roster that included LeBron James and Chris Bosh teaming up with Dwyane Wade. In November 2010, Haslem sustained a torn ligament in his foot, which sidelined him for the rest of the regular season. He returned to action in May 2011 during the playoffs. In June, the Heat were defeated in six games by the Dallas Mavericks in 2011 NBA Finals.

Haslem helped the Heat return to the NBA Finals in 2012. The team defeated the Oklahoma City Thunder in five games, with Haslem winning his second championship.

In November 2012, Haslem passed Alonzo Mourning to become the franchise leader in total rebounds with 4,808, breaking Mourning's previous record of 4,807. Haslem also became the first undrafted player to lead a franchise in rebounding. In June 2013, Haslem won his third championship after the Heat defeated the San Antonio Spurs in seven games in the NBA Finals. After winning his third championship, Haslem revealed he had played through much of the second half of the 2012–13 season with a torn right meniscus.

2013–present: Later years
In 2013–14, Haslem lost the rotation spot he had long occupied. His on-court time continued to significantly diminish as the season progressed. Haslem played in just seven games in January and February combined, and played only two total minutes from January 21 to February 27. Haslem played in just 46 regular-season games in 2013–14, averaging 3.8 points and 3.8 rebounds. The Heat returned to the NBA Finals in 2014 for the fourth straight year, where they were defeated in five games by the Spurs. Following the 2013–14 season, Haslem decided to opt out of the final year of his contract.

Haslem re-signed with the Heat on a two-year deal in July 2014. He re-signed with the Heat on one-year deals in 2016, 2017, and 2018. In January 2019, Haslem indicated that the 2018–19 season would be his last. In April 2019, however, Haslem stated that he had not decided if he was retiring and the decision would not be made until the 2019–20 season.

On August 6, 2019, Haslem re-signed with the Heat to a one-year contract. During the 2019–20 season, Haslem played in four games, including starting at power forward in a loss to the Indiana Pacers during the Heat's regular season finale. During that season, he became the 30th player in league history to play after turning 40 years old, as well as the first modern era undrafted player to play to that age. Following Vince Carter's retirement during the suspension of the season due to the COVID-19 pandemic, Haslem became the oldest active player in the NBA. The Heat reached the 2020 NBA Finals, losing in six games to the Los Angeles Lakers; Haslem was on the active roster but did not play in the postseason.

On November 28, 2020, Haslem re-signed with the Heat. He played in a single game in the 2020–21 season, on May 13, 2021, against the Philadelphia 76ers. Haslem scored four points in two minutes off the bench before getting ejected as a result of a scuffle with Dwight Howard, making the 40-year-old Haslem the oldest player in the last 20 years to get ejected.

On August 15, 2021, Haslem re-signed with the Heat.

On August 23, 2022, Haslem renewed his contract for another year and announced that the 2022–23 season, his 20th in the NBA, would be his last.

Other appearances
Haslem appeared in the music video for the song "GDFR" by Flo Rida, as well as the music video for "Bet That" by Trick Daddy, and the music video for Born-N-Raised by DJ Khaled, Pitbull, Trick Daddy, and Rick Ross.

Personal life

Haslem is married to Faith Rein-Haslem, a sports broadcaster, whom he dated for 14 years. He met Rein in 1999 while attending the University of Florida, where she was a member of the Florida Gators track and field team. The couple have three sons. He also has two brothers and three sisters.

Haslem, among other high-profile athletes and celebrities, was a paid spokesperson for FTX, a cryptocurrency exchange. In November 2022, FTX filed for bankruptcy, wiping out billions of dollars in customer funds. Haslem, alongside other spokespeople, is currently being sued for promoting unregistered securities through a class-action lawsuit. In February 2022, the U.S. 11th Circuit Court of Appeals ruled in a lawsuit against Bitconnect that the Securities Act of 1933 extends to targeted solicitation using social media.

Career statistics

NBA

Regular season

|-
| style="text-align:left;"|
| style="text-align:left;"|Miami
| 75 || 24 || 23.9 || .459 || .000 || .765 || 6.3 || .7 || .4 || .3 || 7.3
|-
| style="text-align:left;"|
| style="text-align:left;"|Miami
| 80 || 80 || 33.4 || .540 || .000 || .791 || 9.1 || 1.4 || .8 || .5 || 10.9
|-
| style="text-align:left; background:#afe6ba;"|†
| style="text-align:left;"|Miami
| 81 || 80 || 30.8 || .508 || .000 || .789 || 7.8 || 1.2 || .6 || .2 || 9.3
|-
| style="text-align:left;"|
| style="text-align:left;"|Miami
| 79 || 79 || 31.4 || .492 || .000 || .680 || 8.3 || 1.2 || .6 || .3 || 10.7
|-
| style="text-align:left;"|
| style="text-align:left;"|Miami
| 49 || 48 || 36.8 || .467 ||  || .810 || 9.0 || 1.4 || .8 || .4 || 12.0
|-
| style="text-align:left;"|
| style="text-align:left;"|Miami
| 75 || 75 || 34.1 || .518 ||  || .753 || 8.2 || 1.1 || .6 || .3 || 10.6
|-
| style="text-align:left;"|
| style="text-align:left;"|Miami
| 78 || 0 || 27.9 || .494 ||  || .762 || 8.1 || .7 || .4 || .3 || 9.9
|-
| style="text-align:left;"|
| style="text-align:left;"|Miami
| 13 || 0 || 26.5 || .512 ||  || .800 || 8.2 || .5 || .5 || .2 || 8.0
|-
| style="text-align:left; background:#afe6ba;"|†
| style="text-align:left;"|Miami
| 64 || 10 || 24.8 || .423 ||  || .814 || 7.3 || .7 || .5 || .4 || 6.0
|-
| style="text-align:left; background:#afe6ba;"|†
| style="text-align:left;"|Miami
| 75 || 59 || 18.9 || .514 ||  || .711 || 5.4 || .5 || .4 || .2 || 3.9
|-
| style="text-align:left;"|
| style="text-align:left;"|Miami
| 46 || 18 || 14.2 || .507 ||  || .568 || 3.8 || .3 || .2 || .3 || 3.8
|-
| style="text-align:left;"|
| style="text-align:left;"|Miami
| 62 || 25 || 16.0 || .448 || .200 || .703 || 4.2 || .7 || .3 || .2 || 4.2
|-
| style="text-align:left;"|
| style="text-align:left;"|Miami
| 37 || 0 || 7.0 || .337 || .111 || .750 || 2.0 || .4 || .1 || .1 || 1.6
|-
| style="text-align:left;"|
| style="text-align:left;"|Miami
| 16 || 0 || 8.1 || .478 || .000 || .600 || 2.3 || .4 || .4 || .1 || 1.9
|-
| style="text-align:left;"|
| style="text-align:left;"|Miami
| 14 || 0 || 5.1 || .200 || .125 || .500 || .7 || .4 || .0 || .1 || .6
|-
| style="text-align:left;"|
| style="text-align:left;"|Miami
| 10 || 1 || 7.4 || .333 || .000 || .750 || 2.7 || .2 || .0 || .0 || 2.5
|-
| style="text-align:left;"|
| style="text-align:left;"|Miami
| 4 || 1 || 11.0 || .364 || .333  || .750 || 4.0 || .3 || .0 || .0 || 3.0
|-
| style="text-align:left;"|
| style="text-align:left;"|Miami
| 1 || 0 || 3.0 || 1.000 ||  ||  || 1.0 || .0 || .0 || .0 || 4.0
|-
| style="text-align:left;"|
| style="text-align:left;"|Miami
| 13 || 0 || 6.4 || .452 || .250 || 1.000 || 1.9 || .3 || .1 || .1 || 2.5
|- class="sortbottom"
| style="text-align:center;" colspan="2"|Career
| 872 || 500 || 24.8 || .489 || .097 || .756 || 6.6 || .8 || .5 || .3 || 7.5

Playoffs

|-
| style="text-align:left;"|2004
| style="text-align:left;"|Miami
| 13 || 0 || 15.3 || .394 ||  || .677 || 3.4 || .2 || .4 || .2 || 3.6
|-
| style="text-align:left;"|2005
| style="text-align:left;"|Miami
| 15 || 15 || 36.2 || .491 ||  || .739 || 10.0 || 1.0 || .5 || .4 || 9.2
|-
| style="text-align:left; background:#afe6ba;"|2006†
| style="text-align:left;"|Miami
| 22 || 22 || 29.5 || .493 || .000 || .683 || 7.4 || .8 || .6 || .3 || 8.6
|-
| style="text-align:left;"|2007
| style="text-align:left;"|Miami
| 4 || 4 || 25.8 || .480 ||  || .750 || 5.3 || 1.0 || .3 || .5 || 7.5
|-
| style="text-align:left;"|2009
| style="text-align:left;"|Miami
| 7 || 7 || 29.1 || .543 ||  || .900 || 8.7 || .4 || .4 || .4 || 8.4
|-
| style="text-align:left;"|2010
| style="text-align:left;"|Miami
| 5 || 0 || 28.4 || .351 ||  || .667 || 7.4 || .8 || .2 || .2 || 6.0
|-
| style="text-align:left;"|2011
| style="text-align:left;"|Miami
| 12 || 0 || 24.2 || .397 ||  || .900 || 4.5 || .8 || .5 || .3 || 5.3
|-
| style="text-align:left; background:#afe6ba;"|2012†
| style="text-align:left;"|Miami
| 22 || 11 || 20.5 || .455 ||  || .743 || 6.4 || .6 || .2 || .3 || 4.8
|-
| style="text-align:left;background:#afe6ba;"|2013†
| style="text-align:left;"|Miami
| 22 || 19 || 16.2 || .593 ||  || .571 || 3.6 || .3 || .7 || .2 || 5.0
|-
| style="text-align:left;"|2014
| style="text-align:left;"|Miami
| 16 || 6 || 10.6 || .459 ||  || .600 || 2.6 || .3 || .1 || .2 || 2.5
|-
| style="text-align:left;"|2016
| style="text-align:left;"|Miami
| 9 || 0 || 9.4 || .533 ||  || .714 || 3.4 || .4 || .0 || .1 || 2.3
|- class="sortbottom"
| style="text-align:center;" colspan="2"|Career
| 147 || 84 || 21.7 || .480 || .000 || .713 || 5.6 || .6 || .4 || .3 || 5.7

College

|-
| style="text-align:left;"|1998–99
| style="text-align:left;"|Florida
| 31 ||  || 21.3 || .603 || .000 || .592 || 5.0 || .8 || .7 || .7 || 10.5
|-
| style="text-align:left;"|1999–00
| style="text-align:left;"|Florida
| 37 ||  || 22.4 || .579 ||  || .639 || 5.1 || .9 || .8 || .8 || 11.8
|-
| style="text-align:left;"|2000–01
| style="text-align:left;"|Florida
| 31 || 31 || 28.1 || .597 ||  || .709 || 7.5 || 1.0 || .8 || 1.0 || 16.8
|-
| style="text-align:left;"|2001–02
| style="text-align:left;"|Florida
| 31 || 31 || 28.3 || .562 || .000 || .694 || 8.3 || 1.6 || .9 || 1.3 || 16.0
|- class="sortbottom"
| style="text-align:center;" colspan="2"|Career
| 130 || 62 || 24.9 || .584 || .000 || .666 || 6.4 || 1.1 || .8 || .9 || 13.7

Records

Miami Heat

Regular season
 Most rebounds (5,780)
 Most defensive rebounds (4,169)
 Most offensive rebounds (1,611)

Playoffs
 Most offensive rebounds (230)

Awards and honors
 3× NBA champion: 2006, 2012, 2013
 NBA All-Rookie Second Team: 2004
 First undrafted player in NBA history to set franchise rebounding record: 2012

See also

 List of Florida Gators in the NBA
 Miami Heat accomplishments and records
 List of NBA players who have spent their entire career with one franchise
 List of oldest and youngest National Basketball Association players

References

External links

 Florida Gators bio

1980 births
Living people
African-American basketball players
All-American college men's basketball players
American expatriate basketball people in France
American men's basketball players
American sportspeople of Puerto Rican descent
Basketball players from Miami
Élan Chalon players
Florida Gators men's basketball players
Miami Heat players
Miami Senior High School alumni
People from Miramar, Florida
People from Southwest Ranches, Florida
Power forwards (basketball)
Undrafted National Basketball Association players
21st-century African-American sportspeople
20th-century African-American people